Gérard Rozenknop (born 23 January 1950 in Paris 19e), is a French public servant.
He was director-general of the École nationale de l'aviation civile (French civil aviation university) from 6 January 1999 to 28 November 2008.

Biography
Rozenknop studied at the Lycée Condorcet, before graduating from the École Polytechnique (X 69) and the École nationale de l'aviation civile (IAC 72). He began his career at the air transport department of the Direction générale de l'aviation civile in 1974. In 1977 he worked for ten years at the International Civil Aviation Organization in Montreal and then to Bangkok (Asia - Pacific programs). In 1987 he was appointed Head of the aeronautics department of ENAC and in 1994 director of the direction régionale de l'aviation civile Sud-Est at Aix-en-Provence. On 6 January 1999 he became director of the École nationale de l'aviation civile (French civil aviation university), until 28 November 2008 and the nomination of his successor, Marc Houalla.

Bibliography
 Académie nationale de l'air et de l'espace and Lucien Robineau, Les français du ciel, dictionnaire historique, Le Cherche midi, June 2005, 782 p.

References

French aerospace engineers
École Polytechnique alumni
École nationale de l'aviation civile alumni
Corps de l'aviation civile
Corps des ponts
1950 births
Living people
Aviation in France
Directors of the École nationale de l'aviation civile